The Rideau Valley Conservation Foundation (RVCF) is a registered environmental charity working to help protect and conserve the lands and waters of the valley of the Rideau River in Eastern Ontario.  The RVCF builds partnerships and seeks new individuals, corporations and groups wanting to get involved in the vital work of taking care of our own natural environment.

The RVCF is a member of the Ontario Land Trust Alliance and participates in Imagine Canada's Ethical Code Program.

Endowment Funds
 Steve Simmering Conservation Land Fund
 Gerald Williams Water Conservation Fund

Chairs 1970-Present

Notes and references

External links
 Official site – Rideau Valley Conservation Foundation

Environmental organizations based in Ontario
Nature conservation organizations based in Canada